The Nermed is a left tributary of the river Gelug in Romania. It flows into the Gelug west of Carașova.

References

Rivers of Romania
Rivers of Caraș-Severin County